John Muir (18 June 1874, Castle Douglas, Scotland – 3 August 1947, Riversdale, Cape Province) was a medical doctor, naturalist and cultural historian.

Education and career
John Muir spent the years 1890-1892 studying Arts and Medicine at the University of St Andrews. He enrolled at the University of Edinburgh in 1892, obtaining a M.B. and C.M. in 1896, and an M.D. in 1902. In 1896 he came to Cape Colony and practised at Worcester, Strydenburg, Sterkstroom and Albertinia before settling in Riversdale. He collected plants extensively in the area as well as seeds found along the coastline. He retired in 1923 to devote himself to these interests as well as the study of shells. He donated his collection of driftseeds to Stellenbosch University in 1929 for which he was awarded an honorary D.Sc. As the recipient of a Carnegie Travelling Grant, he went abroad to study other collections of ocean-borne fruits and seeds. He presented his herbarium to the National Herbarium, Pretoria. At this time he developed an interest in folklore and historical objects and published a number of papers on the subject, besides contributing vernacular names of birds, plants and shells to the Woordeboek van die Afrikaanse Taal. He donated his collection of shells to the South African Museum, some particularly minute species exciting a large amount of interest. Besides his botanical writings, he contributed a number of articles to popular scientific and socio-historical publications, a fair portion of these written in Afrikaans. He is commemorated in the genus Muiria N.E.Br. and in many species such as Leucospermum muirii Phillips, Erica muirii L.Bol., Leucadendron muirii Phillips and Conophytum muirii N.E.Br. His wife, born Susanna Steyn, is also remembered in Protea susannae Phillips and Thesium susannae A.W.Hill, while Muiria hortenseae N.E.Br. was named for his daughter, but is now lumped as a synonym of Gibbaeum hortenseae (N.E.Br.) Thiede & Klak. Vol. 17 of Flowering Plants of South Africa is dedicated to him.

Publications
The Flora of Riversdale, South Africa Mem. Bot. Surv. S.Afr. No.13 of 1929
Seed-drift of South Africa  Mem. Bot. Surv. S.Afr. No.16 of 1937
Gewone Plantname in Riversdal

References
Botanical Exploration of Southern Africa Mary Gunn and LE Codd (Balkema 1981) 

20th-century South African physicians
20th-century South African botanists
South African naturalists
South African cultural historians
People from Castle Douglas
1874 births
1947 deaths
20th-century naturalists
Emigrants from the United Kingdom to Cape Colony